Aguilar is a Statutory Town located in Las Animas County, Colorado, United States. The town population was 456 at the 2020 United States Census. Cattleman and prominent pioneer José Ramón Aguilar founded the town in 1894.

History
The town was named for state legislator J. Ramon Aguilar. Aguilar owned the land that the town was built on. A post office was established at Aguilar in 1890. In 1894 the town was incorporated.

From September 1913 until late April 1914, much of Las Animas County was embroiled by the Colorado Coalfield War, which saw up to 12,000 pro-United Mine Workers of America strikers engaged in both peaceful and violent confrontations with the Rockefeller-owned Colorado Fuel & Iron Company, other mining outfits, strikebreakers, and the Colorado National Guard. On 29 October 1913, the Aguilar post office and several other town structures were destroyed in an arson attack related to the strike. The National Guard arrested several strikers over the attack and handed them over to the federal U.S. Marshal Service.

Following the Ludlow Massacre on 20 April 1914, strikers launched numerous attacks of both coordinated and spontaneous natures against mining operations, strikebreakers, and the National Guard in what is known as the Ten-Day War. One of the attacks was launched against Southwestern Mine Co.'s Empire Mine on 22 April, where armed strikers forced non-striking miners and their families into the mine and began an all-night siege outside. After negotiation led by Aguilar's mayor and a church minister named McDonald, the strikers abandoned the siege before fatalities on either side were reported.

Geography
Aguilar is located at  (37.403299, -104.654363), about one mile west of Interstate 25.

Climate

Demographics

As of the census of 2000, there were 593 people, 243 households, and 165 families residing in the town. The racial makeup of the town was 86.00% White, 3.04% Native American, 0.34% Asian, 6.91% from other races, and 3.71% from two or more races. Hispanic or Latino of any race were 46.54% of the population.

There were 243 households, out of which 23.5% had children under the age of 18 living with them, 48.1% were married couples living together, 14.4% had a female householder with no husband present, and 31.7% were non-families. 27.2% of all households were made up of individuals, and 16.0% had someone living alone who was 65 years of age or older. The average household size was 2.44 and the average family size was 2.93.

In the town, the population was spread out, with 23.3% under the age of 18, 6.6% from 18 to 24, 20.2% from 25 to 44, 28.5% from 45 to 64, and 21.4% who were 65 years of age or older. The median age was 45 years. For every 100 females, there were 97.7 males. For every 100 females age 18 and over, there were 88.8 males.

The median income for a household in the town was $23,750, and the median income for a family
was $30,815. Males had a median income of $22,500 versus $21,250 for females. The per capita income for the town was $11,249. About 27.8% of families and 34.3% of the population were below the poverty line, including 64.0% of those under age 18 and 25.7% of those age 65 or over.

Education
Aguilar Public Schools is part of the Aguilar Reorganized School District RE-6. The school district has one elementary school and one junior/senior high school.

Aguilar Elementary School and Aguilar Junior/Senior High School are located in Aguilar.

See also

Colorado
Bibliography of Colorado
Index of Colorado-related articles
Outline of Colorado
List of counties in Colorado
List of municipalities in Colorado
List of places in Colorado
Spanish Peaks

References

External links

Town of Aguilar website
CDOT map of the Town of Aguilar
Aguilar History

Towns in Las Animas County, Colorado
Towns in Colorado